GPI may refer to:

Economics 
 Gender Parity Index
 Genuine progress indicator
 Global Payments Innovation, a faster international payment service by SWIFT

Education 
 George Padmore Institute, a British library and archives
 Greenfield Park Primary International School, in Quebec, Canada

Government and politics 
 Global Peace Index
 Global Partnership Initiative of the United States State Department

Medicine 
 Generic Product Identifier, a drug classification system
 General paresis of the insane
 Glucose-6-phosphate isomerase, an enzyme
 Glycosylphosphatidylinositol, a glycolipid
 Internal globus pallidus

Science and technology 
 Gemini Planet Imager, a telescope instrument
 General Purpose Input, an uncommitted digital signal pin on an integrated circuit or electronic circuit board used as an input and controllable by the user at runtime. 
 Gibson Plumage Index, an albatross identification system
 Global Address Space Programming Interface, a Linux API
 Grains per inch
 Granite Peak Installation, an American World-War-II-era biological weapons testing facility

Transport 
 Glacier Park International Airport, serving Flathead County, Montana, United States
 Guapi Airport, in Colombia

Other uses 
 Glass Packaging Institute, an American trade association
 Global Poker Index
 Global Press Institute, an American journalism organization
 Godfrey Phillips India, an Indian tobacco company
 Gurley Precision Instruments, an American manufacturer

See also 
 GP1 (disambiguation)